Boy-Cott-In the Industry is the tenth album by Classified, released in 2005. The album reached #46 on Soundscan's Canadian R&B/Hip-Hop albums chart. It contains the singles, "5th Element", "The Maritimes", "No Mistakes", and "Unexplainable Hunger". "5th Element", "The Maritimes", and "No Mistakes" were in Much Music's and MTV Canada's Top 20 hits. "No Mistakes" is Classified's most notable song as it won the MMVA for MuchVibe Best Rap Video.

Track listing

Singles
"5th Element" (2005)
"The Maritimes" (2005)
"No Mistakes" (2006)
"Unexplainable Hunger" (2006)

References

2005 albums
Classified (rapper) albums